Schultheiss is a surname. Notable people with the surname include:

Adrian Schultheiss (born 1988), Swedish figure skater
Hans Schultheiss (1921–2013), Swiss rower 
Joachim Ludwig Schultheiss von Unfriedt (1678–1753), German architect
Louis A. Schultheiss (1925–2014), American academic

See also

de:Schultheiß (Begriffsklärung)
pl:Schultheiss